Urban Boyd Brumbaugh (August 24, 1915 – April 5, 1988) was a professional football player in the National Football League for the Brooklyn Dodgers and the Pittsburgh Pirates (who were later renamed the Pittsburgh Steelers in 1941).

College football
Prior to his professional career, he played college football at Duquesne University from 1935 to 1937, where he received All-American honors. In 1936, he led the Dukes to a 7-0 victory over the Pittsburgh Panthers. It would be Pitts only loss of the season as they won the 1936 National Championship.

Pro football
Brumbaugh was the third overall pick of the 1938 NFL Draft. He was drafted by the Dodgers from 1938 to 1939. During the 1939 season, he was traded to the Pirates-Steelers, where he played from 1939 to 1941.

Honors
He was later elected into the Duquesne Sports Hall of Fame, Curbstone Coaches Hall of Fame, Western Pennsylvania Hall of Fame and the Pennsylvania Sports Hall of Fame.

Family
At the time of his death, Boyd was survived by his wife, Margaret Regina, a son, Jack, a daughter, Eileen and seven grandchildren.

References

1915 births
1988 deaths
People from Springdale, Pennsylvania
Players of American football from Pennsylvania
Brooklyn Dodgers (NFL) players
Duquesne Dukes football players
Pittsburgh Pirates (football) players
Pittsburgh Steelers players